McCann may refer to:

 McCann (surname)
 McCann (company), advertising agency
 McCann Worldgroup, network of marketing and advertising agencies
 Marist College athletic facilities
 McCann Arena
 James J. McCann Baseball Field
 McCann Rescue Chamber